The William E. Brainard House is a historic house in Portland, Oregon, United States. The Mount Tabor neighborhood was one of Portland's prestigious residential districts in the late 19th century, and this 1888 Italianate structure is one of the few stately homes remaining from that period. It was occupied by a series of residents prominent in business, including farmer, real estate investor, and banker William E. Brainard; stock broker and investment banker George W. Davis; and dentist and dental supplier John C. Welch.

The house was added to the National Register of Historic Places in 1979.

See also
National Register of Historic Places listings in Southeast Portland, Oregon

References

External links
 

1888 establishments in Oregon
Houses completed in 1888
Houses on the National Register of Historic Places in Portland, Oregon
Italianate architecture in Oregon
Mount Tabor, Portland, Oregon
Portland Historic Landmarks